St Luke's Hospital is a psychiatric hospital in Armagh, County Armagh, Northern Ireland.

History
The hospital, which was designed by Francis Johnston and William Murphy, opened as the Armagh Asylum in 1825. It expanded with the opening of the Hill Building in 1898. Following the introduction of Care in the Community in the early 1980s the hospital went into a period of decline and various facilities including inpatient dementia care and inpatient addiction services have been progressively withdrawn.

References

External links

Southern Health and Social Care Trust
Health and Social Care (Northern Ireland) hospitals
Hospitals in County Armagh
Hospitals established in 1825
Hospital buildings completed in 1825
Psychiatric hospitals in Northern Ireland
19th-century architecture in Northern Ireland